The apalises are small passerine birds belonging to the genus Apalis, in the family Cisticolidae. They are found in forest, woodlands and scrub across most parts of sub-Saharan Africa. They are slender birds with long tails and have a slender bill for catching insects. They are typically brown, grey or green above and several species have brightly coloured underparts. Males and females are usually similar in appearance but the males are sometimes brighter.

The genus was erected by the English naturalist William John Swainson in 1833. The type species is the bar-throated apalis. The name Apalis is from the Ancient Greek hapalos meaning "delicate" or "gentle". Apalises were traditionally classified in the Old World warbler family Sylviidae but are now commonly placed, together with several other groups of mainly African warblers, in a separate family Cisticolidae.

There are about 24 species of apalis; the exact number varies according to differing authorities.  The African tailorbird and long-billed tailorbird were formerly considered to be apalises but are now often placed either with the tailorbirds (Orthotomus) or in their own genus Artisornis. The red-fronted prinia or red-faced apalis has also been moved into a different genus, Prinia. Further shuffling may be necessary as a recent study found the genus to be polyphyletic, with two species (black-collared and Ruwenzori apalises) only distantly related to the other three tested.

Species list 
The genus contains 25 species:
 Bar-throated apalis, Apalis thoracica
 Yellow-throated apalis, Apalis flavigularis
 Taita apalis, Apalis fuscigularis
 Namuli apalis, Apalis lynesi
 Rudd's apalis, Apalis ruddi
Brown-tailed apalis, Apalis flavocincta
 Yellow-breasted apalis, Apalis flavida
 Lowland masked apalis, Apalis binotata
 Mountain masked apalis, Apalis personata
 Black-throated apalis, Apalis jacksoni
 White-winged apalis, Apalis chariessa
 Black-capped apalis, Apalis nigriceps
 Black-headed apalis, Apalis melanocephala
 Chirinda apalis, Apalis chirindensis
 Chestnut-throated apalis, Apalis porphyrolaema
 Kabobo apalis, Apalis kaboboensis
 Chapin's apalis or chestnut-headed apalis, Apalis chapini
 Sharpe's apalis, Apalis sharpii
 Buff-throated apalis, Apalis rufogularis
 Kungwe apalis, Apalis argentea
 Karamoja apalis, Apalis karamojae
 Bamenda apalis, Apalis bamendae
 Gosling's apalis, Apalis goslingi
 Grey apalis, Apalis cinerea
 Brown-headed apalis, Apalis alticola
Formerly in Apalis but now moved to Oreolais:

 Black-collared apalis, Oreolais pulchra
 Rwenzori apalis or collared apalis, Oreolais ruwenzorii

References

Further reading 
 

 
 
Bird genera